The following articles contain lists of sumo wrestlers:

List of active sumo wrestlers
List of heaviest sumo wrestlers
List of komusubi
List of ōzeki
List of non-Japanese sumo wrestlers
List of past sumo wrestlers
List of sekiwake
List of sumo elders
List of sumo record holders
List of yokozuna

 
Sumo wrestlers